Massey Henry Edgcumbe Lopes, 2nd Baron Roborough, JP (4 October 1903 – 30 June 1992) of Maristow in the parish of Tamerton Foliot, Devon, was a British peer and officer of the British Army.

Early life
Lopes was the only son of Henry Yarde Buller Lopes and Lady Albertha Louise Florence Edgcumbe, the daughter of William Henry Edgcumbe and Katherine Elizabeth Hamilton. He was educated at Eton and Christ Church, Oxford, before joining the Royal Scots Greys in 1925.

Career
From 1936 to 1937, Lopes was aide-de-camp to George Villiers, 6th Earl of Clarendon, the Governor-General of South Africa. He left the regiment in 1938, when he succeeded his father as Baron Roborough, but he rejoined in 1939 with the outbreak of the Second World War. Lopes served throughout the war, being twice wounded.

Lopes became Vice-Lieutenant of Devon in 1951, and then Lord Lieutenant of Devon in 1958, a post he held for the next twenty years. Among a number of posts, he served as a Justice of the Peace and a governor of Exeter University.

Personal life
Lopes was married to Helen Dawson, only daughter of Lt.-Col. Edward Alfred Finch Dawson of Launde Abbey and the former Myra Battiscombe (eldest daughter of Maj. W.B. Battiscombe). Together, they were the parents of two sons and one daughter:

 Hon. Myra Bertha Ernestine Lopes (1937–1979)
 Henry Massey Lopes, 3rd Baron Roborough (1940–2015), who married Robyn Carol Zenda Bromwich, eldest daughter of John Bromwich, of Bacchus Marsh in Victoria, Australia, in 1968. They divorced in 1986 and he married, his first cousin once removed, Sarah Anne Pipon Baker (b. 1951), a daughter of Colin Baker and Penelope Elizaneth Pipon (eldest daughter of Vice-Admiral Sir James Murray Pipon and Hon. Bertha Lopes, a daughter of Henry Lopes, 1st Baron Roborough) in 1986.
 Hon. George Edward Lopes (b. 1945), who married Hon. Sarah Violet Astor, daughter of Gavin Astor, 2nd Baron Astor of Hever and Lady Irene Haig.

Lord Roborough died on 30 June 1992.

Descendants
Through his son George, he was a grandfather of Harry Marcus George Lopes (b. 1977), who was married on 6 May 2006 to Laura Parker Bowles, daughter of Andrew Parker Bowles and Camilla Shand (later the Duchess of Cornwall after her wedding to Charles, Prince of Wales), at St. Cyriac's Church, Lacock, Wiltshire.

Coat of arms

The Arms of Lopes, as granted to Manasseh Masseh Lopes, are blazoned Azure, a chevron or charged with three bars gemelles gules between three eagles rising of the second on a chief of the second five lozenges of the first

References

1903 births
1992 deaths
People from Plymouth (district)
English people of Cornish descent
English people of Portuguese-Jewish descent
Alumni of Christ Church, Oxford
Royal Scots Greys officers
British Army personnel of World War II
Lord-Lieutenants of Devon
People educated at Eton College
English justices of the peace
Massey
British people of Portuguese descent